C. Philip Palmer is a palaeontologist at the Natural History Museum in London. He has worked extensively on molluscs of various types including scaphopods, bivalves and cephalopods.

References

British palaeontologists
Living people
Teuthologists
Year of birth missing (living people)